The Scooby-Doo Project is a 1999 American live-action/animated found footage horror comedy television Halloween special satirising The Blair Witch Project and the Scooby-Doo franchise. It aired during Cartoon Network's Scooby-Doo, Where Are You! marathon on October 31, 1999, broadcast in small segments during commercial breaks, with the segments re-aired in their completed form, with an extended ending, at the end of the marathon. The special won an Annie Award.

Development
In 1999, when three different Scooby-Doo marathons were scheduled for October, three Cartoon Network animators got assigned to create individual packaging and promotion for them. When the film The Blair Witch Project became a major success in August, it resulted in the three of them requesting if they were allowed to pool together their resources to make a satire of the cultural phenomenon. They put together a short proof of concept video consisting of the character Daphne running through the woods and the higher ups at the network approved the idea.

The script was written and produced to air in sketch form within intro and outro bumps across the programming stunt, with the whole content still making sense when compiled together after the fact. The budget given for original animation was limited, so the animators made sure to get all of the characters from the back as part of the package deal; a lot of lipflap was used several times over. The mockumentary-style suburban neighborhood interviews were filmed at one of the producer's mother and fathers' house and both of them appear in the final product. The forest scenes were filmed in the backyard of the home. They all drove up there after regular work hours to stage the tents, piles, and sticks. All live-action footage was shot on Mini-DV. There was also a set of scenes at a drive-in theater which was not included in the marathon. The car used for the Mystery Machine was on a promotional tour in Canada at the time, so a couple of the producers involved flew up and got that footage in a day. The press conference footage was filmed in a conference room by the cafeteria in the middle of a workday. The deputy in the background was played by a programming exec who had worked at several of Cartoon Network's major shows in the last 20 years, and several more from the company who were at the office that day did the voice acting for the press people shouting questions.

The voice cast of the Scooby Gang was recorded over the phone from Los Angeles, and was the same team that was making Scooby-Doo on Zombie Island at around the same time. The whole thing was put together at Turner Studios in Atlanta. The crew was somewhat stricken with panic; they noticed many other people started doing Blair Witch parodies for fall TV premieres on other networks, meaning they had beat them to air, but expressed relief when the press started crowning their special as one of the better ones when it finally premiered. Due to how well received the work was, it ended up being the excess over programming agreed to play the whole special strung together already at the end of the last night.

Plot

Standing outside the Mystery Machine, Velma introduces each member of Mystery Inc. and explains that she is documenting one of their new mysteries.

The footage cuts to the gang's interviews with locals of Casper County, each describing the monster reported to be haunting the woods. Reviewing the information, Velma points out how all the stories are different and thus do not add up. Scooby mentions that he does not like giant cats, leading Daphne to squabble with him over his speech pattern, as she interprets his statement as being about rats. The final interview presented is with an elderly woman who warns them not to go near the woods.

Arriving at the Casper County Woods, Shaggy tells Velma that the woods look more "realistic" and different from their regular woods making him uneasy. Scooby echoes this sentiment, although Fred calms them down, insisting they will have fun, and that it is his turn to unmask the villain. Entering the woods, the gang bids farewell to the Mystery Machine, with Shaggy pointing out that they always solve mysteries at night. When they arrive at the cemetery inside of the woods, the place where the county's curse began, Shaggy is horrified to learn that they will be sleeping nearby. Velma proceeds to explain the curse, but is drowned out by Shaggy and Scooby.

Cutting to the next day, it is revealed that the gang has had an offscreen encounter with the monster in the woods. Velma remarks they have been walking forever to find whoever, or whatever, was trying to scare them. Daphne voices her belief that the monster is a farmer, possibly even the one they had interviewed earlier. She then accuses Velma of irritating him with her camera, to which Velma defends herself, saying she just wanted to make a visual record of their adventure. Daphne points out that all they have done is gotten lost, lived off of the land, and used Scooby for a blanket. Shaggy claims he does not want to sleep outside again, as sleeping against a gravestone hurt his back, to which Scooby agrees.

An irritated Velma asks Fred if he has any ideas, to which he suggests she turn off the camera so they can put up a tent. The footage cuts to later that night, as Velma struggles to put up the tent while filming, not wanting to miss anything. Fred remarks that it would be easier to put up the tent without filming, and the rest of the gang loudly tell her to turn it off. Once the gang has crammed themselves into the single tent, tensions begin to rise. Fred and Daphne pull out sleeping bags, to which Shaggy replies he only has a rock for a pillow. Daphne asks who left snack crumbs in her sleeping bag and accuses Scooby, who in turn accuses Shaggy. Shaggy points the finger at Fred, who is implied to be the culprit, as he then blames Daphne herself, who asks why she would complain if she herself was the culprit. Shaggy accidentally hits Velma with his feet, to which she replies to watch it, and Daphne tells him to take off his shoes, quickly changing her mind once she smells his feet.

The footage cuts to Shaggy telling Scooby about all of the food he would take on a trip to the moon, though Scooby falls asleep. It then cuts to Velma telling a ghost story, though Shaggy interrupts and tells her they were all there, as she is retelling one of their old cases. She then sheepishly turns off her flashlight.

Velma wakes up in the middle of the night to find the tent wide open and goes outside to investigate. She is horrified to find their backpacks have been broken into and all of their food is missing, until she discovers Scooby eating it nearby. Velma wakes up again later to a sound outside the tent which also wakes Daphne. She shouts for Fred, who wakes up from a dream about her. Velma asks if the noise is Scooby again, only to hear Scrappy-Doo yell "Puppy power!" as a response. This sends the entire gang scrambling out of the tent, and into the woods.

After catching their breath, Daphne reprimands Scooby after her stockings get torn, as she does not have another pair. Fred tells them he hears it again, and Scrappy begins asking for his "Uncle Scooby". Fred has the gang turn their flashlights off and Velma questions what Scrappy is doing there. Shaggy asks if Scooby invited him, which Scooby denies. Velma remarks that he is probably there to solve the mystery for them, as he loves doing this, only to be shushed by Fred. They turn the flashlights back on after hearing footsteps, only to find themselves face-to-face with Scrappy.

Back in their tent, the gang hears more noises and Fred suggests splitting up to search. Shaggy vehemently refuses and Daphne begs anyone to go outside for a Scooby Snack. As the monster begins shaking the tent, Fred asks Shaggy and Scooby to dress up like surgeons and tie the monster to an operating table, though Shaggy says he cannot as they are in the woods.

Once convinced to look for the monster, Shaggy and Scooby head to the cemetery where they discuss Hawaiian pizza. Scooby grips onto Shaggy's leg after hearing the monster, and upon letting go, they actually see the monster run across the headstones. The gang desperately and frantically call for Scooby, though he is discovered only a short distance behind them.

The next morning, Velma finds weird piles of Scooby Snacks outside of the tent, and Shaggy claims even he would not touch them as they must be haunted. It is heavily implied, however, that Scooby is the one who piled them up just to scare Shaggy, after receiving access to the snacks.

Velma tries to interpret the map, but Daphne calls her out for failing to do so for the past two hours. Fred claims their destination should be nearby and Daphne complains about her feet hurting, to which Velma calls her out for wearing heels in the forest. Daphne snaps back that at least she tries to look feminine, which stuns Velma into silence. Once again trying to interpret the map later, Velma has it taken away by Fred, while Shaggy and Scooby exclaim that they want to go home.

Fred gets excited when he discovers a trail of footprints in the cemetery, exclaiming the monster must have ten legs, though Velma anguishes over the fact that they are actually the gang's footprints, making Shaggy and Scooby freak out at the fact that they have gone around in a large circle. Fred and Velma begin arguing over who had the map, with both saying the other had it last, but Shaggy and Scooby reveal they ate the map with Tabasco sauce due to it being useless to them. Trying to retrace their steps by studying their footprints, Fred tells everyone to remain calm. Velma points out she is calmer than him, and it is revealed Fred is in the middle of a mental breakdown.

The footage cuts to night, where Fred tells the gang that they have been trapped in the forest for a week, and have not unmasked a villain and says that he misses how they solved mysteries in only 22 minutes. Later, Shaggy and Velma get into an argument over their catchphrases as she asks him what "Zoinks" even means, to which he replies "I'm sorry, what do you want me to say? 'Jinkies'?".

In the next segment, Fred denies Velma's suggestion that he is scared, replying that there must be a perfectly logical explanation for all that has happened. They soon find more piles of Scooby Snacks and, despite Daphne insisting against it, Shaggy and Scooby taste them. Shaggy screams in terror, only for it to be revealed that it is due to the Scooby Snacks being stale.

A while later, Velma loses her glasses, to which Fred loses his patience, yelling at her to get a glasses strap. When she requests assistance in finding her glasses, Fred goes on a rant about her wanting them to find her glasses instead of finding them herself, while pointing the camera at her glasses. Shaggy comes to Velma's defense, stating she is blind as a bat, to which Fred fires back that it is nighttime, meaning visibility is reduced for all of them. By this point it is revealed that Velma has wandered off and that Daphne has gone to look for her.

Daphne breaks down in front of Velma, telling her they have no food, no clean clothes and that she has not painted her nails in two days. Velma shushes her as they hear the monster shrieking in the forest. After another encounter with Scrappy, Velma chases after Daphne, who has gone running blindly into the forest. Even when Velma explains to Daphne that it is just Scrappy, Daphne does not stop, and implies that he is the reason she is running. Daphne and Fred both begin to unravel once Daphne rips both her dress and her other stocking, as well as breaking a nail, while Fred discovers he has lost his favorite ascot.

The gang tracks the monster's noises to a haunted-looking house in the middle of the forest, and go inside to ask for help. Finding a radio, Velma decides to see if they are on the news and switches it on, only for "Seven Days a Week" to start playing. Shaggy exclaims in horror that they always get chased when music is playing, at which point the zombie appears and chases them upstairs. Reaching a hallway, Velma says she hates the part with the doors and stands to the side, filming as the monster chases the others back and forth, from door to door. The monster then pops up directly in front of Velma, chasing her down into the basement, where Shaggy is standing in a corner, facing the wall out of fright. Suddenly, the monster charges at Velma and the screen cuts to black.

Extended ending

The gang has trapped the monster, who is tied to a chair. Fred unmasks him, revealing a random, live-action man. He calls them intrusive kids, which Shaggy points out should be "meddling". Velma questions the man's motive, to which he replies that the date is Halloween. Fred asks why, if that was the case, he had scared them the previous night in the cemetery, to which the man responds that he did not do so. Daphne wonders who it was that scared them then, and the real monster appears, screaming at them through an open window. They drop the camera and run, leaving the man tied to the chair. A struggle and running is heard as the camera cuts out.

It is revealed that the Mystery Machine was eventually discovered abandoned and search parties found hundreds of Scooby Snacks over several days, as well as the camera, though there was no sign of the gang themselves. A "Missing Persons" poster appears showing the entirety of Mystery Inc., suggesting that they disappeared following the monster's attack.

Cast
 Scott Innes as Scooby-Doo, Shaggy Rogers, and Scrappy Doo
 Frank Welker as Fred Jones
 B.J. Ward as Velma Dinkley
 Mary Kay Bergman as Daphne Blake

Reception
A Vanity Fair author stated that the special reproduces the original film "so faithfully that there was no reason to see the dull original." Film critic Kim Newman noted the special as being one of the few Blair Witch Project spoofs which were quite funny. Jonathan Barkan of Bloody Disgusting found the special "pretty damn funny" and "a wonderful meta recognition of how silly horror can sometimes be", he also added that it is a perfect horror story for children as they "can then learn to not take horror 100% seriously" from it. RVA Magazine'''s in contrast felt that its success came mostly due to it shifted boundaries for children's shows; "under the right [lack of] lighting, it was actually kind of scary". He also expressed that the animation and live-action meshed together better than one would have thought. Spencer Voyles of The Journal agreed, stating that it is a "strangely spooky episode that struck fear in the hearts of kids hoping to enjoy a day of classic cartoons". Chris Morgan of Paste magazine described the special as fascinating to look at out of an aesthetic point of view. Rusty Blazenhoff of Boing Boing called the special a gem of 1999.

Accolades

 Legacy 
The original generic animation made for the special went on to be reused in projects long after its airing. Shots of Scooby-Doo got reused several times for Cartoon Campaign 2000 and Fred Jones footage featured prominently during the Cartoon Network halftime show of Big Game: Road Runner vs. Coyote the following year.

In the Big Game cartoon bumper, a "technical issue" leads to Fred and Moltar from Space Ghost Coast to Coast being heard during the "live airing", and it is revealed by Fred that he and the other members of Mystery Inc. escaped from the "monster" and eventually revealed it to be yet another "guy in a mask" whom they arrest. He also states that when they tried to inform people of these events, people ignored them and stated that their footage was "just another tired ripoff of The Blair Witch Project".

The success of the first special prompted Cartoon Network to make a sequel of sorts named Night of the Living Doo in 2001.

The special has never officially been released on its own on home video but three DVD volumes of the "Best of CN On-Air" were produced for posterity which featured it.

The special was uploaded to the Cartoon Network YouTube channel on October 29, 2022, as part of the network's 30th anniversary. The scenes with Scrappy-Doo and the extended ending were removed in the YouTube version.

See also
 List of Halloween television specials

References

Further reading
 
 
 
 
 

External links

 The Scooby-Doo Project'' on Metacritic

1999 television specials
American parody films
American comedy horror films
American short films
American animated television films
Mystery horror films
1990s American television specials
1990s animated television specials
Trimark Pictures films
Scooby-Doo specials
Parodies of Scooby-Doo
1990s parody films
Blair Witch parodies
Parodies of horror
American films with live action and animation
1990s English-language films